The 2016 Alps Tour was the 16th season of the Alps Tour, one of four third-tier tours recognised by the European Tour. It was the first Alps Tour season in which all events received Official World Golf Ranking points, as OWGR points were introduced midway through the 2015 season.

Schedule
The following table lists official events during the 2016 season.

Order of Merit
The Order of Merit was based on prize money won during the season, calculated using a points-based system. The top five players on the tour (not otherwise exempt) earned status to play on the 2017 Challenge Tour.

Notes

References

Alps Tour